Luca Lezzerini  (born 24 March 1995) is an Italian professional footballer who plays as a goalkeeper for Serie B club Brescia.

Club career

Lezzerini is a youth exponent from Fiorentina. He made his Serie A debut on 1 November 2015 against Frosinone. He replaced fellow goalkeeper Ciprian Tătărușanu after 71 minutes in a 4–1 home win.

After a loan, Avellino signed Lezzerini outright on 10 July 2017.

On 30 June 2022, Lezzerini moved to Brescia as a part of the move of Jesse Joronen from Brescia to Venezia.

References

1995 births
Footballers from Rome
Living people
Italian footballers
Italy youth international footballers
Serie A players
Serie B players
ACF Fiorentina players
U.S. Avellino 1912 players
Venezia F.C. players
Brescia Calcio players
Association football goalkeepers